Chicken in the Rough is a 1951 animated short starring Chip 'n' Dale. It is Chip 'n' Dale's first solo cartoon, and footage is reused from Farmyard Symphony. In the short film, Chip 'n' Dale wander into a farmyard to collect acorns. Dale mistakes an egg for a nut, but when he tries to demonstrate to a newly hatched chick how to get back into the egg, a rooster mistakes him for one of his chicks, much to Chip's amusement.

Plot
Chip 'n' Dale are gathering nuts; the nuts fall into the chicken pen. When Dale is playing around with some eggs, one hatches. The chick leaves, and Dale has to pretend to be a chick to avoid the wrath of the rooster.

Voice Cast 
 Jimmy MacDonald as Chip
 Dessie Flynn as Dale
 Florence Gill and Louise Myers as Hens 
 Purv Pullen as Baby Chicks
 Mary Lawrence as Rooster

Releases

Television 
 Walt Disney Presents, episode #5.20: "The Adventures of Chip 'n' Dale"
 Good Morning, Mickey, episode #47
 The Ink and Paint Club, episode #1.48: "The Return of Chip 'n Dale"

Home media

VHS 
 The Adventures of Chip 'n' Dale
 A Tale of Two Chipmunks

DVD 
 Walt Disney's Classic Cartoon Favorites, Vol. 4: Starring Chip 'n' Dale
 Chip 'n' Dale Volume 1: Here Comes Trouble

See also 
 Chip 'n' Dale

References

External links 
 
 Chicken in the Rough at The Internet Animation Database
 Chicken in the Rough on Filmaffinity

1951 animated films
1951 short films
1950s Disney animated short films
Films directed by Jack Hannah
Films produced by Walt Disney
Films scored by Joseph Dubin
RKO Pictures animated short films
1950s English-language films
American animated short films
RKO Pictures short films
1950s American films
Chip 'n' Dale films
Animated films about chickens